Cheick Diarra may refer to:

Cheick Fantamady Diarra (born 1992), Malian footballer
Cheick Modibo Diarra (born 1952), Malian astrophysicist and politician
Cheick Sidi Diarra (born 1957), United Nations adviser

See also
Cheikh-Alan Diarra (born 1993), French professional footballer